Newark Germans was an American soccer club based in Newark, New Jersey that was an inaugural member of the reformed American Soccer League.

Two months into the 1936/37 season the team was taken over and became Paterson Caledonian.

Year-by-year

References

Defunct soccer clubs in New Jersey
American Soccer League (1933–1983) teams
1936 disestablishments in New Jersey
Association football clubs disestablished in 1936
Sports in Newark, New Jersey